Round the Horne is a BBC Radio comedy programme that was transmitted in four series of weekly episodes from 1965 until 1968. The show was created by Barry Took and Marty Feldman, who wrote the first three series. The fourth was written by Took, Johnnie Mortimer, Brian Cooke and Donald Webster. Round the Horne starred Kenneth Horne, with Kenneth Williams, Hugh Paddick, Betty Marsden and Bill Pertwee. The following list shows the dates of first broadcasts and some of the principal items in each programme.

List of programmes

Series 1

Series 2

Series 3

Series 4

Source: BBC Radio 7.

Christmas specials

Broadcast 25 December 1966
 What's on in Swinging London, with Peter Nodule
 Daphne Whitethigh's gossip column
 Horse of the Year Show
 Brad Smallpiece with current events
 The Colour Supplement – The Lively Arts
 Rambling Syd Rumpo: "The Clacton Bogle Picker's Lament"
 Christmas at the BBC, exchanging presents (Charles and Fiona, Julian and Sandy)
 The Fraser Hayes Four – It Happened In Some Valley
 Armpit Theatre – The Hunchback of Notre Dame
(Kenneth Horne was unwell and did not take part in this programme.)

Broadcast 24 December 1967
 The Critics
 Events this Christmas
 Christmas Message
 Armpit Theatre – Cinderella
 Christmas Party – Daphne Whitethigh makes the punch – Madam Osiris predicts – Charles without Fiona
 Rambling Syd Rumpo: "Good King Boroslav"
 Julian and Sandy as cloakroom attendants and entertainers.

Notes and sources

Notes

Sources
 

1965 radio programme debuts
 
BBC Radio comedy programmes